Jack Weyman Nelson (November 8, 1931 – November 5, 2014) was an American competition swimmer and swimming coach.

Nelson represented the United States at the 1956 Summer Olympics in Melbourne, Australia, and competed in the men's 200-meter butterfly, finishing fourth in the event final. He later served as the head coach for the U.S. Olympic women's swim team at the 1976 Summer Olympics in Montreal, Quebec.

Nelson was inducted into the International Swimming Hall of Fame as an "Honor Coach" in 1994, and the American Swimming Coaches Association Hall of Fame in 2009.

Nelson died on November 5, 2014, of complications from Alzheimer's disease; he was 82.

Nelson has been accused by Diana Nyad and others of molestation. Nyad and her teammate first reported sexual assault incidents to the headmaster of Pine Crest, William McMillan, in 1971–72; McMillan subsequently terminated Nelson's contract. Nyad more recently said publicly that Nelson molested her beginning when she was 14 years old and continuing until she graduated from high school at Pine Crest School, as he did with other girls he coached.

See also
 List of members of the International Swimming Hall of Fame
 List of University of Miami alumni

References

External links
 
 
 
 

1931 births
2014 deaths
American male butterfly swimmers
American swimming coaches
Miami Hurricanes swimming coaches
Miami Hurricanes men's swimmers
Olympic swimmers of the United States
People from Walker County, Georgia
Swimmers at the 1955 Pan American Games
Swimmers at the 1956 Summer Olympics
Pan American Games competitors for the United States
Deaths from dementia in Florida
Deaths from Alzheimer's disease
20th-century American people
21st-century American people